The Focke-Wulf S 24 Kiebitz (German: "Lapwing") was a sport aircraft built in Germany in the later 1920s. It was a single-bay biplane of conventional design with equal-span, unstaggered wings, braced with N-type interplane struts. The pilot and a single passenger sat in tandem open cockpits, and it was fitted with a fixed tailskid undercarriage. The wings could be folded for transportation or storage, and the aircraft was designed to be towed by a car.

Specifications (S 24)

References

Further reading
 
 

1920s German sport aircraft
S 24
Single-engined tractor aircraft
Biplanes
Aerobatic aircraft
Aircraft first flown in 1928